The Stranger Prince is a 1937 historical novel by the British writer Margaret Irwin. It is based on the life of Prince Rupert of the Rhine, the cavalry commander of his uncle Charles I during the English Civil War. It was a popular work in its era and remained influential for is portrayal of the Cavaliers during the era.

References

Bibliography
 Hutton, Ronald. Debates in Stuart History. Macmillan, 2004.

1937 British novels
Novels by Margaret Irwin
British historical novels
Novels set in England
Novels set in the 17th century
Chatto & Windus books